The 2016 Judo Grand Prix Tashkent was held at the Sport Hall in Tashkent, Uzbekistan from 6 to 8 October 2016.

Medal summary

Men's events

Women's events

Source Results

Medal table

References

External links
 

2016 IJF World Tour
2016 Judo Grand Prix
Judo
Grand Prix 2016
Judo